Mangalore is a rural locality in the local government areas (LGA) of Brighton and Southern Midlands in the Hobart and Central LGA regions of Tasmania. The 2016 census has a population of 422 for the state suburb of Mangalore.
It is between the townships of Bagdad and Brighton, on the Midland Highway 32 km from the capital city of Hobart.

History 
Mangalore was gazetted as a locality in 1970.
It is named after the city of the same name in the Indian state of Karnataka.

Mangalore Post Office opened on 1 August 1891 and closed in 1969.

Geography
The Jordan River forms part of the southern boundary.

Road infrastructure
The Midland Highway (National Route 1) passes through from south-east to north-west. Route C186 (Black Brush Road) starts at an intersection with Route 1 and runs south-west until it exits.

References

Towns in Tasmania
Localities of Brighton Council (Tasmania)
Localities of Southern Midlands Council